M. A. Matin, Bir Protik is a retired two star rank Bangladesh Army officer and Advisor of Caretaker Government led by Fakhruddin Ahmed.

Career
Matin served in the Bangladesh Army, retiring with the rank of Major General. He was appointed advisor to the Caretaker Government of Bangladesh on 14 January 2007. He was placed in charge of the ministry of Home Affairs.

References

Living people
Bangladesh Army generals
Advisors of Caretaker Government of Bangladesh
Year of birth missing (living people)
Recipients of the Bir Protik
Mukti Bahini personnel